Seburikoko is a Rwandan comedy television series created by Misago Nelly Wilson, produced through Afrifame Ltd. The series began airing on Rwanda Television (RTV) in March 2015.

The series consists of four seasons co-written by Mutiganda Janvier and Misago Nelly Wilson. It is directed by Jones Kennedy Mazimpaka with post production by Samples Studios.

It stars an ensemble cast consisting of Rwandan comedian Niyitegeka Gratien as title character Seburikoko, Antoinette Uwamahoro as his wife, Siperansiya, as well as Erneste Kalisa, Ngabo Leo, and Muhutukazi Mediatrice.

Seburikoko became one of the most popular television programs on Rwanda Television. At the end of season 4 (in March 2016), the television series commissioned four more seasons, ending in March 2017.

Cast 

 Niyitegeka Gratien as Seburikoko
 Antoinette Uwamahoro as Siperansiya
 Umuganwa Sarah as Mutoni
 Mugisha Emmanuel as Kibonge
 Chantal Nyakubyara as Nyiramana
 Ernest Kalisa as Rulinda
 Léon Ngabo as Kadogo
 Noella Niyomubyeyi as Liliane

Recognition 
At the fifth edition of Rwanda Movie Awards, the TV Series received eight nominations, winning awards for Best TV Series, Best Director, Best Cinematographer, and Best Sound Engineer.

Synopsis 
Seburikoko recounts the story of a man called Seburikoko, known as Sebu due to his reputation as a wealthy man in the neighborhood of the fictional village of Gatoto. He does not help his family, spending his time drinking and selling home possessions. His wife, Siperansiya, does everything to feed the family.

Their only child, Mutoni, who they were unable to put in school, moved to Kigali to seek a better life. However, the time comes for her to come back home. The story centers around the family's efforts to change her father's habits.

References 

Rwandan television shows